Arnot is a surname of Scottish origin. Notable people with the surname include:

Hugo Arnot of Balcormo (1749–1786), Scottish advocate, writer and campaigner
Frederick Stanley Arnot, Scottish missionary to Africa
Lizzie Arnot (born 1996), Scottish footballer
Madeleine Arnot, sociologist
Blair Arnot, skateboarder
David Arnot (disambiguation)
John Arnot Jr., US politician
Robert Page Arnot, British Communist politician

See also
Arnott (disambiguation)
Arnup, a surname